National Jewish Television is a three-hour Jewish television block shown Sundays on religious and public-access television cable TV channels in the United States. National Jewish Television was founded in 1979 by Joel Levitch.

History 
National Jewish Television was founded in 1979.

By 1984 NJT was being broadcast to 175 cable channels weekly.

Programming
The Phil Blazer Show—explains Jewish life in Los Angeles and abroad with Phil Blazer serving as host.
Hineni (started 1982)—a half-hour program featuring Rebbitzen Esther Jungreis reading from a book in the Torah and emphasizing the portion.
The Leon Charney Report—an hour-long show featuring Leon Charney discussing politics and other current issues with many guests, mostly from New York City.
L'Chayim, with Rabbi Mark S. Golub interviewing various Jewish personalities and their ideologies.
A Cable to Jewish Life, with Rabbi Josef Katzman interviewing many Orthodox Jewish guests, including Avraham Fried, and their connection with Chabad.

Former shows
Jerusalem on Line with Michael Greenspan, talking about the happenings in Jerusalem. (Ended in 2002)
Jewish Spectrums which interviews various Jews and their accomplishments (Ended in 1995).
RTN, otherwise known as Russian Television Network, featuring an hour-long program for Russian immigrants. (Ended in 1998).
Talkline's Jewish Music Countdown' features various Jewish musicians and their music videos.

References 

Jewish television
Jewish society
Religious television stations in the United States
Television channels and stations established in 1979